Kenelm Thomas Digby (1840 – 20 November 1893) was an Irish Home Rule League and Liberal politician.

He was elected as a Member of Parliament (MP) for Queen's County as a Liberal candidate in 1868, and then again as a Home Rule candidate in 1874, but did not stand at the next election in 1880.

References

External links
 

1840 births
1893 deaths
Home Rule League MPs
Irish Liberal Party MPs
Members of the Parliament of the United Kingdom for Queen's County constituencies (1801–1922)
UK MPs 1868–1874
UK MPs 1874–1880